Judy Crichton (November 25, 1929 – October 14, 2007 ) was an American television news and documentary producer.

As a teenager she assisted her father with the first television coverage of a presidential election in 1944. Crichton later worked for DuMont Television Network as a researcher, writer, and associate producer of the game show What's the Story?, featuring Jimmy Cannon, and Harriet Van Horne. She was a producer for I've Got A Secret from 1952 - 1968. During this period, she wrote and produced a radio series for Betty Furness called Dimensions of a Woman's World.  

Crichton was the principal organizer and producer of New York City's first Earth Day in April 1970.   In 1971, she and Chester Feldman produced a documentary of the making of the Broadway cast album of Company. In 1974, she became the first woman producer for CBS Reports  , and won three Emmy Awards for "The Nuclear Battlefield".

Crichton moved to ABC News to work as a producer and writer for ABC Close-Up, won a DuPont Award for Oh, Tell the World What Happened, and a Christopher Award for Close-Up's piece on Franklin D. Roosevelt.  In 1986, she led the first Western journalism team to report from Angola since its revolution in 1975; the reports aired on Nightline and ABC World News Tonight.  

Crichton was the executive producer of American Experience from 1987-1996. During her tenure, the series won 6 Peabody Awards; 2 DuPont Award Awards); 5 Writers Guild Awards; 5 OAH Awards; and 7 Emmy Awards.   She was awarded the National Humanities Medal by then-President Bill Clinton in 2000.

Personal life
Crichton was married to Robert Crichton until his death in 1993.  The couple had 4 children.

Death 
Judy Crichton died of leukemia on October 14, 2007.

References 
 A Conversation with Judy Crichton
 Talking History with Judy Crichton, Ken Burns, GBH magazine, October 1990

External links
Missing In Action - The Women Behind Television's Golden Age documentary site - WomenBehindTV.com
Current.org
Clinton Presidential Center.org

1929 births
2007 deaths
American documentary filmmakers
Television producers from New York City
American women television producers
Deaths from leukemia
Deaths from cancer in New York (state)
Writers from New York City
Writers from New Rochelle, New York
National Humanities Medal recipients
American women documentary filmmakers
20th-century American women
20th-century American people
21st-century American women